A Cumberland point is a lithic projectile point, attached to a spear and used as a hunting tool. These sturdy points were intended for use as thrusting weapons and employed by various mid-Paleo-Indians (c. 11,000 BP) in the Southeastern United States in the killing of large game mammals.  

This point is primarily found in the Cumberland River basin and through-out the Tennessee River basin.  This point is found with less frequency into the Mississippi River basin and into the Ohio River basin.  This point has been found into the Great Lakes region with rare frequency and have been reported into Minnesota by the University of Minnesota.

See also
Other projectile points

References

External links
Image of a Cumberland point

Indigenous weapons of the Americas
Projectile points
Paleo-Indian period
Southeastern United States